Les Miracles du Brahmine, sold in the United States as The Miracles of Brahmin and in Britain as The Miracles of the Brahmin, is a 1900 French short silent film by Georges Méliès. It was sold by Méliès's Star Film Company and is numbered 237–240 in its catalogues.

The film is derived from a magic act Méliès created and performed at his Paris stage venue, the Théâtre Robert-Houdin. Méliès appears in the film as the brahmin of the title; according to film historian Georges Sadoul, Jeanne Mareyla plays the woman in the center of the group of three. A print of the film survives, and was shown at the film festival Il Cinema Ritrovato in 2020.

References

External links
 

French black-and-white films
Films directed by Georges Méliès
French silent short films
1900s French films